Burnettia cuneata, commonly known as the lizard orchid, is the only species of the flowering plant genus Burnettia in the orchid family, Orchidaceae. It is a leafless terrestrial, mycotrophic herb with one or two leaf-like bracts and up to seven flowers that are brownish on the back and pink or white inside. It is endemic to southeastern Australia where it grows in dense thickets in swamps.

Description
Flowering occurs between September and December but nearly always only after fires the previous summer.

Taxonomy and naming
Burnettia cuneata was first formally described in 1840 by John Lindley from a specimen collected in Tasmania and the description was published in his book The Genera and Species of Orchidaceous Plants. The specific epithet (cuneata) is a Latin word meaning "wedge-shaped".

Distribution and habitat
The lizard orchid grows in dense thickets of Melaleuca and Leptospermum in near coastal swamps in New South Wales, Tasmania and Victoria. In New South Wales it occurs south from the Blue Mountains and in Victoria between Portland and Mallacoota with a disjunct population in the Grampians.

See also
 List of Orchidaceae genera

References

External links

 Retired Aussies, Burnettia cuneata, Lizard Orchid
 Flickr,  Malcolm, Burnettia cuneata

Monotypic Orchidoideae genera
Diurideae genera
Orchids of Australia
Orchids of Victoria (Australia)
Orchids of New South Wales
Orchids of Tasmania
Megastylidinae
Plants described in 1840